Anžići is a village in Croatia located in Istria, in the municipality of Višnjan, in Istria County. In 2001, the village had 44 inhabitants.

Demographics

See also 
Antonci, Poreč

Notes and references 

Populated places in Istria County